is a passenger railway station located in the city of Tachikawa, Tokyo, Japan, operated by East Japan Railway Company (JR East).

Lines 
Nishi-Tachikawa Station is served by the Ōme Line, and is located 1.9 kilometers from the starting point of the line at Tachikawa Station.

Station layout 
This station consists of a single island platform serving two tracks. The station is staffed.

Platforms

History
Nishi-Tachikawa Station opened on 15 November 1931. With the privatization of Japanese National Railways (JNR) on 1 April 1987, the station came under the control of JR East.

Passenger statistics
In fiscal 2019, the station was used by an average of 6,661 passengers daily (boarding passengers only).

Surrounding area
 Showa Memorial Park

See also
 List of railway stations in Japan

References

External links

JR East station information 

Railway stations in Tokyo
Railway stations in Japan opened in 1931
Tachikawa, Tokyo
Ōme Line